Marina Alekseyevna Litvinovich (born 19 September 1974) is a Russian opposition activist and politician.

Life
Litvinovich became active in politics in 1996. In the late 1990s she created Russia's first political website for Boris Nemtsov, at that point deputy prime minister. Nemtsov later became a highly visible opponent of Vladimir Putin's regime, until he was shot and killed in Moscow in 2015. For two years Litvinovich herself worked for Putin, helping his campaign in the 2000 Russian presidential election:

Though she considered running for political office as early as 2003, Litvinovich continued working as a political consultant for other people's campaigns. She was a consultant for Mikhail Khodorkovsky, who was Russia's richest tycoon until he was jailed for a decade after falling foul of the Kremlin. She later worked as an assistant to opposition politician Garry Kasparov, acting as a spokesperson for his United Civil Front. In April 2007 she complained of Kasparov's questioning by the FSB, the Russian state security agency:

In July 2007 Litvinovich highlighted the case of opposition activist Larisa Arap, who had been forced into a psychiatric clinic. In November 2007 she reported Kasparov's beating by police as he attempted to lead a protest rally. In December 2007 she announced that Kasparov would not be running for the presidency, as his supporters had been unable to rent a hall for his nomination gathering.

From 2019 to 2021 Litvinovich served on the Moscow Public Monitoring Commission (ONK), a watchdog monitoring the condition of inmates in Russian prisons. In March 2021 Litvinovich was excluded from the ONK, on the grounds that she had disclosed information relating to a probe into Lyubov Sobol, a lawyer for the jailed opposition politician Aleksei Navalny's Anti-Corruption Foundation. Litvinovich disputed the allegation, claiming the exclusion was due to her activism on behalf of people detained in Lefortovo detention center.

In 2021 Litvinovich ran in Russia's parliamentary elections as a candidate for the Duma: 

On 24 February 2022, as Russia invaded Ukraine, Litvinovich called for antiwar protests in Russian cities. She was detained by Russian police as she left her house.

References

1974 births
Living people
Russian human rights activists
Russian anti-war activists
21st-century Russian politicians
Russian women activists
Women human rights activists
21st-century Russian women politicians
Russian activists against the 2022 Russian invasion of Ukraine
Russian people of Belarusian descent